Nguyen Quang Lap is a Vietnamese writer, playwright, and screenwriter. He has won several prizes of the Vietnamese government. His political publications led to his arrest in 2014. Out of Vietnam's 34 imprisoned bloggers counted by Reporters Without Borders, he is the only mainstream author, often featured by Vietnam's official media.

Biography 
Nguyen Quang Lap was born in 1956 in Quang Trach. He graduated from the University of Hanoi as a radio engineer.

Nguyen Quang Lap joined the army from 1980 to 1985, stationed in Quang Ninh then in Da Nang. Some of his early works were written during this period. After leaving the army he worked at Kim Dong Publishing House and for the Saigon Tiep Thi newspaper.

He was arrested on December 6, 2014 under article 258 of the Vietnamese Penal Code, which allows for prison terms of up to 3 years for "abus[ing] the rights to freedom of speech, freedom of press, freedom of belief, religion, assembly, association, and other democratic freedoms to infringe upon the interests of the State."

Works 
 The Deserted Valley, 2002
 The Little Heart, 2008

See also
 Human rights in Vietnam
 Nguyễn Văn Hải
 Le Quoc Quan

References 

1950s births
Living people
Prisoners and detainees of Vietnam
Vietnamese activists
Vietnamese bloggers
Vietnamese dissidents
Vietnamese journalists
Vietnamese prisoners and detainees